John Thornton Down VC (2 March 1842 – 27 April 1866) was a British Army officer and a recipient of the Victoria Cross, the highest award for gallantry in the face of the enemy that can be awarded to British and Commonwealth forces.

Victoria Cross
Down was 21 years old, and an ensign in the 57th Regiment of Foot (later The Middlesex Regiment), British Army during the Second Taranaki War (one of the campaigns in the New Zealand Wars), when the following deed took place on 2 October 1863 at Poutoko, New Zealand for which he and Drummer Dudley Stagpoole were awarded the VC:

Down died of fever at Camp Otahuhu on 27 April 1866. His grave in Ōtāhuhu (Holy Trinity) Churchyard is maintained by the New Zealand Ministry for Culture and Heritage.

References

External links

1842 births
1866 deaths
British recipients of the Victoria Cross
57th Regiment of Foot officers
British military personnel of the New Zealand Wars
New Zealand Wars recipients of the Victoria Cross
People from Fulham
Infectious disease deaths in New Zealand
British Army recipients of the Victoria Cross